is a Japanese manga written and illustrated by Hinako Takanaga. It was first serialized by Gentosha in Comic Birz. Later, it was licensed in North America by Blu Manga, an imprint of Tokyopop, in Germany by Tokyopop Germany, and in Poland by Studio JG.

Plot
College student Itaru Yaichi is found drunk and lying on a pile of garbage by Kōki Kuwabara, a cameraman who works for a small local cable station. Accidentally, Itaru ends up breaking Kuwabara's camera during a fight, after he thought Kuwabara had insulted him. The next day, Itaru wakes up in the Kuwabara's apartment and learns that Kuwabara saved his life. However, Kuwabara demands the money from the broken camera: ¥200,000 (around US$1,700), but Itaru doesn't have any money. Kuwabara allows Itaru to stay in his apartment until he gets a job and pays his debt.

Reception
Leroy Douresseaux enjoyed the character development over the volume, and the delayed gratification of the couple getting together. Matthew Warner enjoyed the "balance between romance and comedy" in the volume, and felt that the tameness of the manga made it a suitable entry point to the boys love genre. Jennifer Dunbar enjoyed the "steady, energetic art" and the character development of the side cast.

References

External links
 

2005 manga
Gentosha manga
Romance anime and manga
Seinen manga
Tokyopop titles
Yaoi anime and manga